Smith Bluffs is a line of ice-covered bluffs with many rock exposures, marking the north side of Dustin Island and the south limit of Seraph Bay. Discovered in helicopter flights from the USS Burton Island and Glacier of the U.S. Navy Bellingshausen Sea Expedition, February 1960, and named for Philip M. Smith of the National Science Foundation, United States Antarctic Research Program (USARP) Representative on this expedition.

Cliffs of Ellsworth Land